The .20 VarTarg is a wildcat centerfire rifle cartridge, based on the .221 Remington Fireball case, necked down to fire a  bullet.

The name VarTarg is a portmanteau of varmint and target.

There is also a .20 VarTarg Turbo based on the .222 Remington

See also

.204 Ruger
.20 Tactical
.221 Fireball
5 mm caliber
List of rifle cartridges

References

6mmBR
Woodchuck Den

Pistol and rifle cartridges
Wildcat cartridges